Ferris is a village in Hancock County, Illinois, United States. The population was 156 at the 2010 census.

Geography
Ferris is located in north-central Hancock County at  (40.468753, -91.169448).

Demographics

As of the census of 2000, there were 168 people, 69 households, and 44 families residing in the village. The racial makeup of the village was 97.62% White, 0.60% African American, and 1.79% from two or more races.

There were 69 households, out of which 27.5% had children under the age of 18 living with them, 58.0% were married couples living together, 2.9% had a female householder with no husband present, and 34.8% were non-families. 31.9% of all households were made up of individuals, and 15.9% had someone living alone who was 65 years of age or older. The average household size was 2.43 and the average family size was 3.04.

In the village, the population was spread out, with 23.8% under the age of 18, 9.5% from 18 to 24, 27.4% from 25 to 44, 22.6% from 45 to 64, and 16.7% who were 65 years of age or older. The median age was 38 years. For every 100 females, there were 112.7 males. For every 100 females age 18 and over, there were 100.0 males.

The median income for a household in the village was $41,667, and the median income for a family was $47,188. Males had a median income of $27,250 versus $22,188 for females. The per capita income for the village was $16,341. None of the families and 2.7% of the population were living below the poverty line.

References

Villages in Hancock County, Illinois
Villages in Illinois